The Men's 10,000 metres competition at the 2020 World Single Distances Speed Skating Championships was held on February 14, 2020.

Results
The race was started at 13:59.

References

Men's 10,000 metres